The 1959–60 National Football League was the 29th staging of the National Football League (NFL), an annual Gaelic football tournament for the Gaelic Athletic Association county teams of Ireland.

The first all-Ulster final attracted a record crowd for a League final and was won by Down.

Format

Group stage

Division I (Dr Lagan Cup)

Play-offs

Group A

Group B

Division II

Table

Division III

Table

Division IV

Group A play-off

Final

Group A

Group B

Knockout stage

Semi-final

Final

References

National Football League
National Football League
National Football League (Ireland) seasons